This is a list of Bengali language   films released in India in the year 2015.

January–March

April–June

July–September

October–December

References

Bengali
Bengali
 
2015